Guanía River is a river of Colombia. It is part of the Amazon River basin.

See also
List of rivers of Colombia

References
Rand McNally, The New International Atlas, 1993.

Rivers of Colombia
Tributaries of the Rio Negro (Amazon)

de:Río Guanía